Studies in Ethics, Law, and Technology is an online peer-reviewed academic journal that examines the ethical and legal issues that arise from emerging technologies. The journal addresses the broad scope of technologies and their impact on the environment, society, and humanity rather than focussing on bioethics. Topics covered by the journal include biotechnology, nanotechnology, neurotechnology, information technology, weapons, energy and fuel, space-based technology, and new media and communications. The editor-in-chief is Anthony Mark Cutter.

External links
 

Ethics journals
Law journals
Publications established in 2007
English-language journals
Triannual journals